Rhytidocystis is a genus of apicomplexans. It is the only genus within the monotypic family Rhytidocystidae. The species of this genus are parasitic protozoa found in marine annelids.

Taxonomy
There are four species known in this genus:
 Rhytidocystis cyamus Rueckert & Leander 2009 
 Rhytidocystis opheliae Henneguy 1907
 Rhytidocystis polygordiae
 Rhytidocystis sthenelais Porchet-Henneré 1972

References

Conoidasida
Apicomplexa genera